Senator Wolf or Wolfe may refer to:

Dan Wolf (born 1957), Massachusetts State Senate
Louis Wolf (1825–1887), Wisconsin State Senate
Pam Wolf (born 1963), Minnesota State Senate
William P. Wolf (1833–1896), Iowa State Senate
Jay Wolfe (born 1963), West Virginia State Senate
Simeon K. Wolfe (1824–1888), Indiana State Senate

See also
Senator Wolff (disambiguation)